Bernardin Poisson (born 1948) is a retired Haitian military officer, who served as the Commander-in-Chief of the Armed Forces of Haiti from 17 November 1994 to 20 February 1995, during the Operation Uphold Democracy.

References

1948 births
Living people
Haitian military personnel
Haitian generals